Mongolian diaspora refers to people of Mongolia who live outside their country of origin. According to the Mongolian census of 2010, 107,140 Mongolian nationals were reported to be living abroad for more than six months. The largest Mongolian populations were recorded as being in South Korea, the United States, the Czech Republic and China. The provisional results of the 2020 census show that the number of Mongolians living abroad had risen to 122,301.

China has a population of 5.8 million native ethnic Mongols, who mainly reside in the province of Inner Mongolia. During the Mongol invasions and conquests, many people permanently settled in areas conquered by Mongol armies.

2010 census
The 2010 Mongolian census recorded 107,140 citizens living abroad for six months or more, representing 3.9% of the total population.

References

See also
 Hazaras
 Qara'unas